Luis García Rodríguez (died 1638) was a Roman Catholic prelate who served as Bishop of Astorga (1637–1638) and Bishop of Orense (1634–1637).

Biography
Luis García Rodríguez was ordained a priest on 18 September 1604.
On 23 January 1634, he was appointed during the papacy of Pope Urban VIII as Bishop of Orense.
On 21 September 1634, he was consecrated bishop by Francisco Sánchez Villanueva y Vega, Bishop of Mazara del Vallo, with Miguel Avellán, Titular Bishop of Siriensis, and Juan Bravo Lagunas, Bishop Emeritus of Ugento, serving as co-consecrators. 
On 9 February 1637, he was appointed during the papacy of Pope Urban VIII as Bishop of Astorga.
He served as Bishop of Astorga until his death on 18 April 1638.

References

External links and additional sources
 (for Chronology of Bishops) 
 (for Chronology of Bishops) 
 (for Chronology of Bishops) 
 (for Chronology of Bishops) 

17th-century Roman Catholic bishops in Spain
Bishops appointed by Pope Urban VIII
1638 deaths